The popularity of the Super Mario series led to the release of several spin-off Mario educational games from 1988 to 1996. Nintendo had little involvement in the development of these games; they were created by various other developers, including The Software Toolworks and Interplay Entertainment. Some of the titles were released exclusively for either the Nintendo Entertainment System (NES), the Super NES (SNES), or for personal computers, while others were released on two or more of those platforms. The Mario educational games were generally designed for use by children in preschool or kindergarten and focused on developing skills ranging from language and typing to geography and history. The educational games were not well-received, with many critics and gamers labeling them as some of the worst Mario games ever made. Many of them have spawned Internet memes.

I Am a Teacher: Super Mario Sweater
 is a Famicom Disk System game released in 1986 only in Japan. It was designed by Royal Industries Co., Ltd., a Japanese appliance and sewing machine company. Using the program, players could design the sweater they want and the company would make it for 2900 yen (~$24).

Mario Discovery Series
The "Mario Discovery Series" is a label given to five Mario educational games that were developed by The Software Toolworks.

Mario Is Missing!Mario Is Missing! is a geography-based game released in 1993 for the PC, Macintosh, Super NES and NES. The NES version was developed by Radical Entertainment, while the other versions were developed by The Software Toolworks.

In the game, Bowser sets up a castle in Antarctica, and plans to use hair dryers to melt the continent's ice and flood Earth. He sends Koopas to cities across Earth to steal artifacts to fund his operation. Mario, Luigi and Yoshi travel to Bowser's castle to stop him. Mario is kidnapped by Bowser, prompting Luigi to rescue him. Luigi progresses through the game by completing levels in Bowser's castle; each floor is guarded by one Koopaling and contains a number of pipes which transport Luigi to a city containing Koopas. Once a floor is completed, Luigi must defeat the Koopaling guarding that floor to go ahead to the next. The main gameplay consists of moving around a city in side-scrolling manner while jumping on Koopas to collect stolen artifacts (pieces of famous landmarks). Luigi then must "secure" the city by taking these artifacts to their respective locations and correctly answering two questions about the landmark. Once an artifact is returned, the landmark is reopened.

Mario Is Missing! is the first Mario game to feature only Luigi as the starring character, which did not occur again until Luigi's Mansion, a game released for the Nintendo GameCube in 2001.

Mario's Time Machine

Mario's Time Machine was originally released on MS-DOS, and was later released on the NES and Super NES. The MS-DOS version was re-released as Mario's Time Machine Deluxe in 1996. In the game, Bowser steals artifacts from various points in history using a time machine and Mario must return them back. Mario Is Missing! and Mario's Time Machine were generally poorly received.

Mario's Early Years! games

The Mario's Early Years! games were released for the Super Nintendo Entertainment System and computers. The three games were Mario's Early Years! Fun with Letters; Mario's Early Years! Fun with Numbers; and Mario's Early Years! Preschool Fun (known in the United Kingdom as Mario's Playschool). The games were released in September, October, and November 1994, respectively, and all support the SNES Mouse peripheral. The games contain Mario, Princess Peach and Yoshi on a wooden boat traveling from island to island, learning about various subjects. All three games use the same game engine.

Mario Teaches Typing games

Mario Teaches Typing was released on personal computers and was designed to teach typing skills to children. The game was developed and published by Interplay Productions. 

A sequel, Mario Teaches Typing 2, was developed by Brainstorm and published by Interplay in 1997.

Mario's Game Gallery

Mario's Game Gallery features five traditional games which play very similarly to their real world counterparts but with Mario themes. The player faces off against Mario (voiced by Charles Martinet in his first appearance) in these games. While the game and its re-release Mario's FUNdamentals have been praised by some, others consider it to be one of the worst games to feature Mario.

Super Mario Bros. & Friends: When I Grow Up
Super Mario Bros. & Friends: When I Grow Up is a children's computer coloring game featuring Mario and Luigi. It was released in 1991 for MS-DOS. Players can paint Mario and other Nintendo characters.

References

 
Super Nintendo Entertainment System games
Nintendo Entertainment System games
Children's educational video games
Video games scored by Charles Deenen
Typing video games